Home is the second studio album by the American band Deep Blue Something. It was released by RainMaker Records in 1994, and rereleased on Interscope in 1995. The band supported the album by touring with Duran Duran.

Production
The songs were written and sang by the Pipes brothers.

Critical reception

Trouser Press wrote: "Bringing the brain-dead grandiosity of late-'70s harmony-rockers like Styx and Supertramp to the modern world, Deep Blue Something ... combines big acoustic/electric strumming and airy, melodramatic singing into a resoundingly hollow album unimproved by its good intentions." The Washington Post stated: "A folk-rock band that frequently attacks its material with hard-rock vehemence, Deep Blue Something is the latest Southern combo to mate R.E.M. with '70s mainstream rock." 

The Austin Chronicle awarded the album zero stars (out of five), deeming it "lame," and its hit single "safely stupid." The Philadelphia Inquirer called Home "a melodic amalgamation of kicky power pop, hair-in-your-face shoe-gazer drone, and neo-progressive '70s guitar rock, all infused with punk energy, sly optimism, and plenty of jangly guitars."

AllMusic praised the "power-pop sound straight out of late-'70s/early-'80s Great Britain."

Track listing
All songs written by Todd Pipes, except where noted.
 "Gammer Gerten's Needle" [Instrumental] – 3:17
 "Breakfast at Tiffany's" (Re-recorded version) – 4:16
 "Halo" – 2:44
 "Josey" (Toby Pipes / Kirk Tatom) – 4:07
 "A Water Prayer" – 3:20
 "Done" (Toby Pipes / Todd Pipes) – 3:20
 "Song to Make Love To" (Todd Pipes / Toby Pipes) – 3:08
 "The Kandinsky Prince" – 2:25
 "Home" – 4:28
 "Red Light" (Toby Pipes) – 4:04
 "I Can Wait" – 3:04
 "Wouldn't Change a Thing" – 3:59

Personnel

Band members
 Todd Pipes – bass guitar, acoustic & electric guitars, keyboards, lead & backing vocals
 Toby Pipes – acoustic & electric guitars, keyboards, lead & backing vocals
 Kirk Tatom – acoustic & electric guitars, bass guitar, keyboards, backing vocals
 John Kirtland – drums, percussion

Production
 David Castell – producer, engineer (track 2), mastering, mixing
 Greg Ellenwood – engineer (tracks 1, 3–12)
 Gil Pena – cover art
 Robert Greeson – art direction
 James Bland – band photo
 Manish Patel – "cigarette and match strike" (track 9)

Charts

Weekly charts

Year-end charts

Certifications

References

1994 albums
1995 albums
Deep Blue Something albums
Interscope Records albums
Albums produced by David Castell